Buzar (also Romanized as Būzār and Boozar; also known as Būzā) is a village in Kuhestan Rural District, Rostaq District, Darab County, Fars Province, Iran. At the 2006 census, its population was 27, in 7 families.

References 

Populated places in Darab County